This is a list of Superfund sites in Nebraska designated under the Comprehensive Environmental Response, Compensation, and Liability Act (CERCLA) environmental law.  The CERCLA federal law of 1980 authorized the United States Environmental Protection Agency (EPA) to create a list of polluted locations requiring a long-term response to clean up hazardous material contaminations.   These locations are known as Superfund sites, and are placed on the National Priorities List (NPL). The NPL guides the EPA in "determining which sites warrant further investigation" for environmental remediation.  As of March 26, 2010, there were 13 Superfund sites on the National Priorities List in Nebraska.  No sites are currently proposed for entry on the list.  One site has been cleaned up and removed from the list.

Superfund sites

See also
List of Superfund sites in the United States
List of environmental issues
List of waste types
TOXMAP

References

External links
List of Superfund sites in Nebraska

Superfund
Nebraska
Superfund